Mr. Smith Carries On is a 1937 British crime film directed by Lister Laurance and starring Edward Rigby, Julien Mitchell and H. F. Maltby. It was made at Pinewood Studios as a quota quickie for release by Paramount Pictures. The screenplay concerns a secretary who accidentally shoots a business tycoon.

Cast
 Edward Rigby as Mr. Smith  
 Julien Mitchell as Mr. Minox  
 H. F. Maltby as Sir Felix  
 Dorothy Oldfield as Hilary Smith 
 Basil Langton as Jerry Stone 
 Franklyn Bellamy as Mr. Williams 
 Margaret Emden as Mrs. Smith 
 Frederick Culley as Mr. Fane 
 Dorothy Dewhurst 
 Joe Monkhouse
 John Singer as Boy

References

Bibliography
Chibnall, Steve. Quota Quickies: The Birth of the British 'B' Film. British Film Institute, 2007.
Low, Rachael. Filmmaking in 1930s Britain. George Allen & Unwin, 1985.
Wood, Linda. British Films, 1927–1939. British Film Institute, 1986.

External links
 

1937 films
1937 crime films
British crime films
Films shot at Pinewood Studios
Films produced by Anthony Havelock-Allan
British black-and-white films
British and Dominions Studios films
1930s English-language films
1930s British films